Uvaria dulcis is a species of woody climber in the Annonaceae family. It is found in tropical Asia, in a disjunctive distribution, eastern Indonesia, Jawa, and then Mainland Southeast Asia. The plant has an edible fruit, which in Khmer language has the colourful name triël dâhs krabéi (="triel of the buffalo udders").

Taxonomy
Phylogenetic analysis indicated that this species in a well-supported clade with Uvaria ferruginea and Uvaria siamensis and a weak clade with  Uvaria hahnii  
The most recent taxonomic analysis (2018) shows for taxonomic traits (anatomical features), the species is in a clade with Uvaria cuneifolia and Uvaria pauciovulata, and these are in a clade with U. hahnii, U. ferruginea, and U. siamensis.  
However their dna analysis showed U. dulcis in a clade with Uvaria dasoclema and U. ferruginea, embedded in a clade with U. hahnii.

The species was named by the French botanist Michel Félix Dunal (1789-1856), in 1817. He was chair of natural history at the University of Montpellier for 40 years. He described the taxa in the work Monographie de la famille des anonacées.  
The taxa was known as Anomianthus heterocarpus from 1858, as described by the Swiss botanist Heinrich Zollinger (1818-59), who worked and died in Jawa. The Orcadian botanist James Sinclair (1913-68), of the Royal Botanic Garden Edinburgh and the Singapore Botanic Gardens, recognised that the species epithet dulcis had priority and the taxa became known as Anomianthus dulcis from 1958. In 2009 phylogenetic analysis by Zhou, Su and Saunders showed that the genus Anomianthus was part of the Uvaria genus and the name U. dulcis was once more accepted. J.F. Maxwell had considered the plant was in the Uvaria genus in 1975.

Description
A sarmentose shrub or woody climber (liana), up to 30m in length. The leaves range from elliptic to broadly-elliptic, to shortly-obovate with a subcordate to shortly-cordate base and acute apex. The flowers of the plant are yellowish-green and fragrant, and the fruits are yellow and red in colour. Petals are narrow, inner petals are narrower, the inner petals have a pair of marginal glands (nectaries). The carpels have one or two ovules.  Distinguishing features include: the broadly-elliptic to shortly-obovate leaves with retuse to shortly-cordate base and acute apex; 15-18 subparallel leaf-veins, which frequently branch basally and medially; tomentose indument on younger shoots, sparse later, becoming subglabrous, except over midrib which is tomentose with about 1mm long erect hairs; the inner petals glands; coriaceous to membranous, flattened petals, at first broadly-elliptical to acute, then expanding at maturity to obovate to acute, about 21.5 by 11.5mm in size; about 14-16 ovules.

Distribution
The species is native to a disjunctive area, covering parts of Mainland Southeast Asia and eastern Malesia. Countries and regions where the taxa occurs are: Indonesia (Nusa Tenggara, Maluku Islands, Jawa); Thailand; Cambodia; Vietnam; Laos; Myanmar.

Habitat and ecology
Often found in scrub vegetation, but most common in disturbed moist forests (in which it can form large patches of population).  Common in the lower rainfall areas of central Jawa and northeastern Thailand.

Within the Khao Khiao–Khao Chomphu Wildlife Sanctuary, Chonburi Province, central Thailand, there is lowland evergreen forest (up to 600m altitude), with an upper canopy 40m high dominated by Dipterocarpus alatus, Pterospermum diversifolium, Walsura pinnata, Irvingia malayana, Ficus annulata, Ficus capillipes, and Ficus sundaica. U. dulcis is one of the vines and small climbers found in this community.

Vernacular names
nom maew son {Thai language}
triël dâhs krabéi (="triel of the buffalo udders", Khmer language)

Uses
The fruit, the same size as buffalo udders (see #Vernacular names), are much appreciated as a snack or titbit in Cambodia, and are sold in the market in March and April.

In Thai traditional medicine, a water decoction of the plant has been used as fever treatment and as to promote milk production.

References

dulcis
Edible plants
Flora of Cambodia
Flora of Java
Flora of Laos
Flora of Myanmar
Flora of Thailand
Flora of the Lesser Sunda Islands
Flora of the Maluku Islands
Flora of Vietnam
Plants described in 1817